The 1995 NCAA Division I women's soccer tournament was the 14th annual single-elimination tournament to determine the national champion of NCAA Division I women's collegiate soccer. The semifinals and championship game were played at Fetzer Field in Chapel Hill, North Carolina during December 1995.

Notre Dame defeated Portland in the final, 1–0 (in three overtimes), to win their first national title. Coached by Chris Petrucelli, the Irish finished the season 21–2–2. This was the first championship since 1985 not won by North Carolina, whose record streak of nine consecutive national titles (1986–1994) was broken. This was also the first final match to not feature the Tar Heels.

The most outstanding offensive player was Cindy Daws from Notre Dame, and the most outstanding defensive player was Kate Sobrero, also from Notre Dame. Daws and Sobrero, were named to the All-tournament team.

The tournament's leading scorer, with 4 goals and 1 assist, was Danielle Garrett from SMU.

Qualification

All Division I women's soccer programs were eligible to qualify for the tournament. A total of 24 teams were invited to participate in this tournament.

Teams

Bracket

All-tournament team
Robin Confer, North Carolina
Cindy Daws, Notre Dame (most outstanding offensive player)
Erin Fahey, Portland
Danielle Garrett, SMU
Shannon MacMillan, Portland
Holly Manthei, Notre Dame
Michelle McCarthy, Notre Dame
Wynne McIntosh, Portland
Cindy Parlow, North Carolina
Jen Renola, Notre Dame
Kate Sobrero, Notre Dame (most outstanding defensive player)
Staci Wilson, North Carolina

See also 
 NCAA Division II Women's Soccer Championship
 NCAA Division III Women's Soccer Championship

References

NCAA
 
NCAA Women's Soccer Championship
NCAA Division I Women's Soccer Tournament
NCAA Division I Women's Soccer Tournament
NCAA Division I Women's Soccer Tournament
Women's sports in North Carolina